Freesat+ is a consumer brand introduced to raise consumer awareness and promote sales of Freesat-capable digital TV recorders, otherwise known as personal video recorders. Freesat+ affords users similar features that are available with competitor services such as Sky+ and Freeview+.

Background
Freesat+ offers a PVR functionality for Freesat, which offers a greater choice of channels compared to Freeview, including a greater number of HD channels, without the subscriptions of Sky or Virgin Media. Freesat also offers higher rates of coverage than Freeview.

Manufacturers
Freesat do not manufacture the units itself, but will award the Freesat+ label to manufacturers that are able to meet a series of specifications that have been drawn up by the UK’s Digital TV Group.

Many manufacturers provide Freesat+ set-top boxes such as: Humax, Manhattan, Bush, Sagemcom, Goodmans and others.

See also
 High-definition television in the United Kingdom
 ETSI TS 102 323 V1.4.1 (2010-01), Chapter 11: "Accurate recording" and Annex A: "Example recorder behaviour"

References

External links
 Freesat
 Freesat – HD TV Recorders & Freesat Playback

Digital television in the United Kingdom
Digital video recorders